Glitter is a mixture of shiny, flat reflective particles.

Glitter may also refer to:
Glitter (chimpanzee)
Glitter bombing, a form of civil disobedience

Film and television 
 Glitter (film), a 2001 American romantic musical drama starring Mariah Carey
 "Glitter" (How I Met Your Mother), a television episode
 Glitter (TV series), an American television drama series

Music 
 Glitter rock, also known as glam rock
 Gary Glitter (Paul Francis Gadd, born 1944), English pop star and convicted sex offender
 The Glitter Band, Gary Glitter's former background band

Albums
 Glitter (Gary Glitter album), 1972
 Glitter (soundtrack), to the 2001 film
 Glitter (Kaya album), 2006
 Glitter (070 Shake EP), 2018

Songs
 "Glitter" (No Age song)
 "Glitter" (Perfume song)
 "Glitter" (Benee song)
 "Glitter" (Tyler, the Creator song)
 "Glitter"/"Fated", a 2007 song by Ayumi Hamasaki
 "Glitter", a song from the 1997 album Generation Swine by Mötley Crüe
 "Glitter", by Todrick Hall from Haus Party, Pt. 1

Other
 Glitter, Stephanie Harrington, a character from the Marvel Comics series D.P. 7